Curtis Joseph "C.J." Mahoney is an American attorney and a Deputy General Counsel at Microsoft. Previously a partner at Williams & Connolly, Mahoney served as the Deputy United States Trade Representative (Investment, Services, Labor, Environment, Africa, China, and the Western Hemisphere) from 2018 to 2020.

Early life and education
Mahoney was born in Russell, Kansas and attended Russell High School. He has an A.B. in government from Harvard College, where he was Phi Beta Kappa and graduated magna cum laude. In 2006, he received his J.D. from Yale Law School, where he was editor-in-chief of the Yale Law Journal. Mahoney clerked for Alex Kozinski of the United States Court of Appeals for the Ninth Circuit. He also clerked for United States Supreme Court Justice Anthony Kennedy from 2007 to 2008.

Legal career
Prior to his government service, Mahoney was a trial lawyer and partner at the Washington, D.C. law firm of Williams & Connolly LLP, where his practice focused on international commercial arbitration, white-collar defense, the Foreign Corrupt Practices Act, legal malpractice, and First Amendment law.

The United States Senate unanimously confirmed Mahoney to serve as Deputy United States Trade Representative on March 1, 2018.

Mahoney led efforts to renegotiate the North American Free Trade Agreement and secure passage of its successor agreement, the United States-Mexico-Canada Agreement (USMCA), in the U.S. Congress.  The USMCA passed the United States House of Representatives by a vote of 385 to 41 and the United States Senate by a vote of 89 to 10. The Washington Post described the overwhelming, bipartisan vote as “nice return to normalcy” in a time of partisan gridlock.

Mahoney oversaw the United States Trade Representative's digital trade initiatives and helped launch free trade agreement talks with the United Kingdom and Kenya. He also negotiated and signed an agreement between the United States and the African Union to support implementation of the African Continental Free Trade Area (AfCFTA).

Mahoney resigned as Deputy United States Trade Representative in October 2020.

In January 2020, President Trump announced his intent to nominate Mahoney as the State Department Legal Adviser. Mahoney's nomination drew praise from members of the Federal Government of Mexico with whom he had worked during the USMCA negotiations and from prominent critics of the Trump Administration, including former Legal Advisor John Bellinger and former Assistant Attorney General Jack Goldsmith. A bipartisan group of former government officials, including former Legal Advisors, endorsed Mahoney's nomination in a letter to the Senate Foreign Relations Committee. In July 2020, the Committee held a hearing on his nomination and reported him favorably to the full Senate by unanimous consent. On January 3, 2021, his nomination was returned to the President under Rule XXXI, Paragraph 6 of the United States Senate.

On February 26, 2021, Microsoft announced that Mahoney had joined the tech giant as Deputy General Counsel, U.S. International Trade and Azure.

Other professional activities
Mahoney has served on the Yale Law School Fund Board and as a visiting clinical lecturer at the law school where he taught a course on international arbitration.

Mahoney serves on the Advisory Board of the Robert J. Dole Institute of Politics at the University of Kansas.

Personal life
On August 13, 2005, Mahoney married Rebecca Ann Iverson in Washington, D.C.

Mahoney is the nephew of Emmy-nominated actress Marj (Mahoney) Dusay.

See also
 List of law clerks of the Supreme Court of the United States (Seat 1)

References

Living people
People from Russell, Kansas
Harvard University alumni
Yale Law School alumni
21st-century American lawyers
Trump administration personnel
Lawyers from Washington, D.C.
Washington, D.C., Republicans
Law clerks of the Supreme Court of the United States
Year of birth missing (living people)